Muslim In Trump’s America is a 2020 current affairs documentary film produced for ITV's Exposure strand. The film had its British premiere on 1 November 2020, and Norwegian Premier on NRK 2 on 2 November.

In this documentary, director Deeyah Khan investigates the impact of rising anti-Muslim hate groups, conspiracy theories and hate crimes since 2015. Khan meets the family of a Kansas farmer serving 30 years for an anti-Muslim bomb plot; she films with a right wing, armed militia who believe that Muslims are trying to take over America; and she meets ordinary Muslims whose lives have been shattered by violence and intolerance. Deeyah also meets the campaigners who are trying to combat a rising tide of hatred; and seeks to get to the heart of the Muslim experience in America; experiences of alienation, of rejection, and the daily struggles of keeping faith with both Islam and the American Dream.

Muslim In Trump’s America has won a Peabody Award in News category.

Cast
Ilhan Omar
Rais Bhuiyan
Baktash Ahadi
Hattie Stein
Chris Hill
Ken Stein
Nichole Clinger
Alicia Berzins
Michael Boggus
Imam Mohammed Omar
Wajahat Ali
Ronald Haddad
Fardousa Jama
Asma Jama
Keith Ellison

References

External links
Official website

2020 television films
2020 films
2020 documentary films
British documentary films
British television documentaries
Documentaries about politics
Films directed by Deeyah Khan
2020s British films